Vinoth is an Indian given name and surname.

Notable people with the name include:

Surname
 Charles Vinoth, Indian actor
 Gnaruban Vinoth, Sri Lankan footballer
 H. Vinoth, Indian director
 Kalloori Vinoth (born 1988), Indian actor

Given name
 Vinoth Baskaran (born 1990), Singaporean footballer 
 Vinoth Kishan (born 1989), Indian actor
 Vinoth Kumar (born 1994), Indian football player

See also
Vinod